Handsworth is a suburb and an inner-city area of Birmingham in the West Midlands, England. Historically in Staffordshire, Handsworth lies just outside Birmingham City Centre and near the town of Smethwick.

History

The name Handsworth originates from its Saxon owner Hondes and the Old English word weorthing, meaning farm or estate. It was recorded in the Domesday Survey of 1086, as a holding of William Fitz-Ansculf, the Lord of Dudley, although at that time it would only have been a very small village surrounded by farmland and extensive woodland.

Historically in the county of Staffordshire, it remained a small village from the 13th century to the 18th century. Accommodation was built for factory workers, the village quickly grew, and in 1851, more than 6,000 people were living in the township. In that year, work began to build St James' Church. Later St Michael's Church was built as a daughter church to St James'. In the census of 1881, the town was recorded as having approx. 32,000 residents. By the census of 1911, this had more than doubled to 68,610.

The development of the built environment was sporadic and many of Handsworth's streets display a mixture of architectural types and periods – among them some of the finest Victorian buildings in the city. Handsworth has two grammar schools – Handsworth Grammar School and King Edward VI Handsworth School (for girls). St Andrew's Church is a listed building in Oxhill Road which also held Sunday school classes in a small building on the corner of Oxhill Road and Church Lane. It also contains Handsworth Park, which in 2006 underwent a major restoration, the vibrant shopping area of Soho Road and St. Mary's Church containing the remains of the founders of the Industrial Revolution - Watt, Murdoch and Boulton.  The 1901 Red Lion public house was grade II* listed in 1985, but has been empty since 2008 and is considered "at risk".

Handsworth parish was transferred from Staffordshire to Warwickshire, and became part of Birmingham, in 1911. The redbrick building with the clocktower in the photograph was originally the offices of the district council on Soho Road.

Birmingham historian Dr. Carl Chinn noted that during the Second World War the boundary between Handsworth and the outlying suburb of Handsworth Wood marked the line between being safe and unsafe from bombing, with Handsworth Wood being an official evacuation zone, despite being at least ten miles away from any countryside that might now qualify as "green belt" land, and being on the periphery of many "high risk" areas. During the Second World War, West Indians had arrived as part of the colonial war effort, where they worked in Birmingham munitions factories. In the post-war period, a rebuilding programme required much unskilled labour and Birmingham's industrial base expanded, significantly increasing the demand for both skilled and unskilled workers. During this time, there was direct recruitment for workers from the Caribbean and the area became a centre for Birmingham's Afro-Caribbean community.

A tram depot was erected near Birmingham Road, next to the border with West Bromwich, during the 1880s, and remained in use until the tram service ended in 1939. Although it has since been demolished, a replica of the depot was created later in the 20th century at the Black Country Living Museum in Dudley.

The West Indian population in Birmingham numbered over 17,000 by the 1961 census count. In addition, during this time, Indians, particularly Sikhs from the Punjab arrived in Birmingham, many of them working in the foundries and on the production lines in motor vehicle manufacturing, mostly at the Longbridge plant some 10 miles away.

Boulton and Watt 

Matthew Boulton's Soho Manufactory was set up on the northern edge of Handsworth, on Handsworth Heath. It operated from 1766 to 1848, and was demolished in 1863. Boulton commissioned Samuel Wyatt to design his nearby house Soho House, which is now a museum.

In 1790, Heathfield Hall, also designed by Wyatt, was built for Boulton's business partner, the engineer James Watt. Watt died in the house in 1819, and was buried at nearby St Mary's Church. In the 1880s engineer George Tangye bought the hall and lived there until his death in 1920. From 1927 the hall was demolished and the lands redeveloped. What was the Heathfield Estate is now the land that comprises West Drive and North Drive. Watt's workshop from the house was dismantled and rebuilt in the Science Museum, London.

Civil unrest, social issues and community

A riot occurred in 1981, during which similar riots took place in Brixton (London), Chapeltown (Leeds), and Toxteth (Liverpool). The 'sus' law (Vagrancy Act 1824) saw black youths being disproportionately stopped, searched and arrested by the police, on the grounds of mere 'suspicion' of possible illegal activity; this, along with high unemployment and social alienation, was a key element of the backdrop to the 1981 riots. The subsequent Scarman report (1981) concluded that the riots were "essentially an outburst of anger and resentment by young black people against the police". A similar social backdrop of tensions and hostility towards the police existed during the rioting of September 1985 (which lasted for two days, beginning in Lozells Road, Lozells, and spreading into Handsworth) to which this unrest was ascribed.

After the 1985 riots and a change in perception of British sub-urban integration, community relations were reviewed. Local government worked to improve community relations as a way of managing both racial and cultural differences. Encouragement was provided by arts organisations such as West Midlands Ethnic Minority Arts Service; its director, Pogus Caesar, photographed the riots, and Black Audio Film Collective produced the 1986 film Handsworth Songs.

There was further unrest in 1991 and 2005; with a fatality occurring during the 2005 riot. The 2011 England riots also spread to the Handsworth area.

The Guardians online article "Riots don't happen without a reason" (August 2011) seeks to explore the context and histories of these inner-city riots, since the 1980s; emphasising the need for improvements in the relationship between the community and the police.

In the 2010s neighbourhood schemes and developments have helped to improve the area. Businesses in the area, particularly on Soho Road have contributed towards schemes in partnership with council. Soho Road, Holyhead Road & Soho Hill is within a Business Improvement District (BID) area.
 
A number of initiatives promoting community cohesion exist within this multicultural community. The Handsworth Community Choir boasts a blend of singers from the area.  The Handsworth Park Community Garden opened in July 2017.  The community website ‘Inside Handsworth’, shares community news, events and stories.

Musical legacy 
Handsworth has produced some notable popular musical acts: Steel Pulse (whose first studio album Handsworth Revolution is named after the area), Joan Armatrading, Pato Banton, Benjamin Zephaniah, Swami, Apache Indian, Ruby Turner and Bhangra group B21. In addition, hard rock band Black Sabbath's lead guitarist and songwriter Tony Iommi, Steve Winwood, pop singer Jamelia and progressive rock drummer Carl Palmer were born in Handsworth.

The tenor Webster Booth was born in Handsworth in 1902, and began his singing career as a child chorister at the local parish church of St. Mary's. Together with his duettist wife Anne Ziegler, he became a mainstay of West End musicals and World War II musical films. A BBC Showbiz Hall of Fame article described him as "possessing one of the finest English tenor voices of the twentieth century."

Events
Handsworth Park has hosted numerous events: The Birmingham Tattoo, The Birmingham Festival (both originally called Handsworth- rather than Birmingham). The Handsworth Carnival grew out of the Flower Show and Carnival; Caribbean-style carnivals began in Handsworth Park, in 1984, with a street procession via Holyhead Road. In 1994 the carnival was held in Handsworth Park for the last time. The following year it was moved from the park out onto the streets of Handsworth, since which time it has been known as the Birmingham International Carnival. In 1999, it was again held in a park, but this time in Perry Park.

Education
Among education providers is the Rookery School, a 100-year-old mixed state primary school, still housed largely in its original buildings. Secondary schools include Handsworth Wood Girls' Academy, Holyhead School, St John Wall Catholic School, also, selective state schools such as King Edward VI Handsworth Grammar School for Boys and King Edward VI Handsworth School (girls).

Notable people 

 Joan Armatrading (born 1950), singer-songwriter and musician, grew up in the Brookfields area, since largely demolished and now part of Handsworth. She attended Canterbury Cross School
 Francis Asbury, born in Handsworth, bishop of the Methodist Episcopal Church
 Pato Banton, reggae singer
 Henry Barber, Birmingham businessman whose bequest founded the Barber Institute of Fine Arts
 Matthew Boulton (1728–1809), lived in Soho House, buried at St Mary's Church
 Harry Samuel Bickerton Brindley, engineer and businessman
 Roy Fisher (1930-2017), poet and jazz pianist
 David Hinds (born 1956), lead singer of reggae group Steel Pulse, grew up in Handsworth
 Tony Iommi, guitarist and founding member of heavy metal band Black Sabbath, was born in Handsworth
 Carl Palmer (born 1950) drummer and percussionist. with bands including The Crazy World of Arthur Brown, Atomic Rooster, Emerson, Lake & Palmer, and Asia.
 Ian Emes, animator and film director
 Bert Freeman (1885–1955), England international footballer was born in Handsworth
 Mr Hudson, singer
 Apache Indian, dancehall artist
 Jamelia (born 1981), singer-songwriter
 Bunny Johnson, former British Heavyweight boxing champion 
 Bitty McLean, reggae singer
 M1llionz (born 1998), rapper, born in Handsworth
 Darren Moore, footballer
 Jimmy Moore, England international footballer was born in Handsworth
 Bill Morris migrated to Handsworth from Jamaica. He later led the TGWU and after retirement was enabled as Baron Morris of Handsworth.
 William Murdoch (1754–1839), inventor. He was the first to make extensive use of coal gas for illumination and a pioneer in the development of steam-power. In 1777, he entered the engineering firm of Matthew Boulton and James Watt, whose experiment on the distillation of coal and wood first brought gas lighting to a practical stage, illuminating their factory with it in 1803. Presented with the Rumford Medal by the Royal Society. Buried at St Mary's Church
 George Ramsay (1855–1926), Secretary/Manager of Aston Villa in the most successful period of the club's history. Buried at St Mary's Church
 Tommy Roberts, professional footballer
 Malkit Singh, Punjabi folk singer 
 Daniel Sturridge, professional footballer, attended St Mary's C of E Primary School 
 John and Joan Taylor, founders of Grosvenor Road Studios
 Albert Toft, sculptor
 Ruby Turner (born 1968), soul and R&B singer 
 James Watt (1736-1819), inventor and mechanical engineer, buried at St Mary's Church
 Caroline Watts (1868–1919), painter and illustrator
 Steve Winwood (born 1948), rock musician 
 Benjamin Zephaniah  (born 1958), poet and writer, grew up in Handsworth

Transport
The Birmingham Canal Navigations Main Line Canal passes through the area, as does the former London, Midland & Scottish Railway main line between Birmingham and Wolverhampton. The West Midlands Metro has a stop at Handsworth Booth Street. The area is also served by National Express West Midlands bus services 11A, 11C, 16, 74 & 101.

References

Simon Baddeley (1997), The Founding of Handsworth Park 1882-1898, Birmingham University
Carl Chinn (1996), Brum Undaunted: Birmingham During the Blitz, Birmingham Library Services
Peter Drake (1998), Handsworth, Hockley, & Handsworth Wood, Tempus, Stroud, Glos.
Allen E. Everitt (1876), Handsworth Church and its Surroundings, E.C. Osborne, Birmingham
Frederick William Hackwood (1908), Handsworth: Old & New: A History of Birmingham's Staffordshire Suburb (re-published: A & B Books, Warley, West Midlands)
John Morris Jones (1980), The Manor of Handsworth: An Introduction to its Historical Geography, with amendments by "Friends of Handsworth Old Town Hall", 1969. Handsworth Historical Society
Handsworth General Purposes & other Committees - Minute Book 1880A, Handsworth Local Sanitary Board, Birmingham City Council, Central Library Archives (ref: BCH/AD 1/1/1)
Handsworth & Birmingham newspaper cuttings collected and arranged by G. H. Osborne between approx. 1870 and 1900, Birmingham City Council, Central Library Archive (ref: L.f30.3)
Victor J. Price (1992), Handsworth Remembered, Studley: Brewin Books
Lord Scarman (1981), Scarman Inquiry into the Brixton Riots, April 1981: Lord Scarman's report

External links 

Birmingham City Council's Handsworth Ward pages
Digital Handsworth 
Handsworth History

 
History of Staffordshire